Rude Paper is a South Korean collaboration consisting of reggae artist Koonta of Koonta and Nuoliunce and music producer Real Dreamer.

Biography

Pre-debut
Before coming together, they were already known contributors to the music industry with their respective talents. Koonta is part of the Korean reggae duo Koonta and Nuoliunce  and represented the reggae world in Korea alongside Skul1. Real Dreamer is a producer who is known for producing for known music artists like Double K, Outsider and Simon D.

Debut and You are not loser
On April 26, 2011, they debuted the music video for their title song "Radio" that displayed their unique talent and personalities. They released on September 30 with their new song "You Are Not Loser" and the music video that revealed to be inspirational song about a son walking in the footsteps of his blind father.

Realise and collaboration
On January 26, Rude Paper released their song Realise showcasing Dubstep and Hip hop blend. They went on to collaborate with Miryo (Brown Eyed Girls) on her first solo album in the song "Revenger".

Discography

Music Videos
"Radio"
"You Are Not Loser"
"Hand"
"비오는 밤에"

References

External links

Musical groups established in 2011
2011 establishments in South Korea